Kaimukī is a residential neighborhood in Honolulu, Hawaii, United States.

History

In the 19th century the area was a farm of King Kalākaua, where ostriches roamed wild over the mountain side.  It later became the site of a carnation farm for funeral flowers.  Now a mix of residential area with a small business district (mainly restaurants and service industries), it is located in the urbanized Honolulu region near Kahala and Diamond Head.

Kaimukī is an ancient Hawaiian name.  Its name comes from Ka imu kī meaning "The ti root oven" in the Hawaiian language. The area was known for the many ovens used to bake roots of kī Cordyline fruticosa, or ti, into a sweet food similar to candy.

Kaimukī's main street is Waialae Avenue, pronounced . Several restaurants and stores are located on this street, as well as Kaimukī District Park.

Pu‘u o Kaimukī aka “Kaimuki Hill” is the predominant feature of the area and has been a reservoir, a telegraph station, an observatory, and now a park.

Architecture
The neighborhood of Kaimukī is home to historic buildings. The Kaimuki Fire Station, designed in the Spanish Mission Style by G.R. Miller, was built in 1924 and is still used as a station today. The Queen Theater, designed by Lyman Bigelow, opened in 1936 but closed in 1985.

Education

Colleges and universities
Kapi‘olani Community College, one of ten branches of the public University of Hawaii system, is located in Kaimuki  as is the private Chaminade University.

Public schools

Hawaii Department of Education operates public schools.
Waialae School, a public charter elementary school, is located in Kaimuki, between 19th Avenue and 20th Avenue. Kaimuki Middle School is in the area.
Kaimuki High School is located in Kaimuki and serves much of the area considered to be Kaimukī. Kalani High School serves some students from Kaimukī.

Private schools
Saint Louis School for boys and Sacred Hearts Academy for girls are located in Kaimuki as well as St. Patrick School (COED K-8). Kaimuki Christian School (COED P3-11) is located on Koko Head Avenue.

Weekend educational programs
The Hawaii Japanese School - Rainbow Gakuen (ハワイレインボー学園 Hawai Rainbō Gakuen), a supplementary weekend Japanese school, holds its classes in Kaimuki Middle School in Honolulu and has its offices in another building in Honolulu.

Notable residents
Israel Kamakawiwo'ole was raised in the neighborhood.

References

Neighborhoods in Honolulu